The Indianapolis Greyhounds, also UIndy Greyhounds and formerly the Indiana Central Greyhounds, are the athletic teams that represent the University of Indianapolis, located in Indianapolis, Indiana, in NCAA Division II intercollegiate sports. The Greyhounds compete as members of the Great Lakes Valley Conference for all 23 of their varsity sports. Indianapolis has been part of the GLVC since 1978 and, as of 2022-23, is the only remaining charter member of the conference.

Varsity teams

List of teams
 
 
Men's sports 
Baseball
Basketball
Cross country
Football
Golf
Lacrosse
Soccer
Swimming and diving
Tennis
Track and field
Wrestling

 
Women's sports 
Basketball
Cross country
Golf
Lacrosse
Soccer
Softball
Swimming and diving
Tennis
Track and field
Volleyball

Facilities
Athletics and Recreation Center – Also known as the ARC, it served as the practice site for the New York Giants prior to their victory in Super Bowl XLVI. The ARC features a  air-supported dome with a training room, a competition-fit indoor track facility, baseball batting cages, an expanded weight room, an indoor golf practice facility, multi-purpose courts for basketball and other sports, and locker rooms for football, men's and women's soccer, men's and women's track and field, softball, and baseball. The new facility also includes  of office space. The coaching staffs of football, men's and women's soccer, men's and women's track and field, softball, baseball and men's and women's golf all work in the ARC.
Key Stadium – Originally built in 1970, Sprinturf playing surface added in 2004, lights added in summer of 2005, seating capacity of 5,500 with standing room only space for approximately 1,500 more
Nicoson Hall – Opened in 1960, seating capacity of 4,000 with standing room only space for approximately 1,000 more, named for long-time basketball coach and Athletic Director Angus Nicoson
Ruth Lilly Center Court – Opened in 1982, seating capacity of 500
Ruth Lilly Center Pool – Opened in 1982, seating capacity of 300
Greyhound Park – seating capacity of 750
Baumgartner Field – seating capacity of 300, built in 2012, named for Mary "Wimp" Baumgartner who played in the Women's Professional Baseball League during the late 1940s
UIndy Tennis Center – Seven indoor courts located at the UIndy Tennis Center. Info can be found at www.uindytenniscenter.com.

Individual teams

Men's teams
Baseball – Greyhound Park – School record 51 wins in 2001, made 15 NCAA Tournament appearance, including trips to the NCAA Division II World Series in 2000 and 2012
Basketball – Nicoson Hall – Has been to 12 NCAA Division II Tournaments (1996, 1997, 2003, 2004, 2005, 2011–16, 2023); David Logan named 2005 NCAA II National Player of the Year by numerous media outlets. Eight Hoosier Collegiate Conference championships (1948–49, 1950–51, 1955–56, 1962–63, 1963–64, 1965-65 and 1966–67) and one Great Lakes Valley Conference title (1996–97).
Cross Country 
Football – Five Hoosier Collegiate Conference championships (1947, 1953–55, 1960), two Heartland Collegiate Conference championships (1978, 1981), and seven GLVC championships (2012-15, 2017-18, 2020, 2022). Qualified for NCAA Division III playoffs in 1975, NCAA Division II playoffs in 2012, 2013, 2015, 2017, 2018, 2019, and 2022.
Golf – League-record 13 GLVC titles, with 11 coming under long-time coach Ken Partridge. Brownsburg, Ind., native Seth Fair finished fourth as an individual at the 2010 NCAA Division II National Championship tournament, held at The Sagamore Golf Club in nearby Noblesville, Ind. (co-hosted by the University of Indianapolis).
Lacrosse – GLVC champions 2018, 2019, and 2021. Final four appearance in 2019 (16-3 record), in just the fourth year of the program's existence.
Soccer – Key Stadium – Started in 1981 – School record 15 wins in the 2012 season, that saw them advance to the program's first NCAA Tournament. Recorded program's first GLVC championship in 2014. Made second national tournament appearance in 2015 after setting program record with 12 shutouts. 
Swimming and Diving – Ruth Lilly Center Pool – team has claimed 11 individual national championships, including Orel Oral's 7 national championships from 1998 to 2002. Cole Tedhams won the national championship in the 50 free in 2004 and 2005 and the 100 free in 2005. Alex Arestis won the  free at the 2008 Division II Nationals.  Men have finished in top 15 in 13 of the last 19 years NCAA Championships, including a best of 3rd in 2018.
Tennis – Second in conference history with eight GLVC championships. Has qualified for 10 NCAA Division II National Championships (1997, 2000–01, 2003, 2005–06, 2009, 2014–16.
Indoor Track – Numerous All-American awards and GLVC championships, anchored by the throwing and sprinting events.
Outdoor Track and Field – Key Stadium – Numerous All-American and GLVC championships, headlined by Dameion Smith's men's NCAA Division II hammer throw national title in 2004. Alumni from the UIndy men's track team have also had success competing at the USA Track and Field National Championships and USA Olympic Trials. UIndy Alumni competitors in past USA Track and Field Championships include Dave Wollman (shot put), Dennis Young (discus), Randy Heisler (discus), Andy Richardson (shot put), Dameion Smith (hammer) Cory Young (hammer, discus), and Aaron Lawson (hammer).
Wrestling – Nicoson Hall — Finished 10th as a team at NCAA II Championships in 2006, with 4 all-Americans including Mike Jackson (2nd place at 174). Finished 6th in 2022 and had two finalists

Women's teams
Basketball – Nicoson Hall – school record 29 wins in 2002–03 season, 11 NCAA Tournament appearances (1993, 1995, 2003–2005, 2008–10, 2012–14)
Cross Country – academic all-American Maria Harriman finished 42nd in 2002 NCAA II XC Championships
Golf – League-record 10 GLVC titles (1999–2001, 2008–09, 2012–16). Earned UIndy's first ever National Championship in the 2014–15 season, and a second National Championship in 2018-19. Finished as the Division II national runners-up in 2015-16.
Lacrosse – National Champions in 2022 (22-1 record), in just the sixth year of the program's existence.
Soccer – Key Stadium – 2006 GLVC Champions, NCAA II Sweet Sixteen, school record 17 wins in 2006.
Softball – Baumgartner Field – School record 54 wins in the 2013 season, highlighted by a 39-game win streak and program record tying 28 GLVC wins. Advanced to the Division II World Series in 2009 & 2015.
Swimming and Diving – Ruth Lilly Center Pool – Women finished in top 12 at NCAA Championships for 12 years in a row from 2001 to 2012, including best of 6th in 2007. Megan Grunert was the 2004 Indiana NCAA Woman of the Year and one of the 10 NCAA Woman of the Year finalists. Team won GLIAC championships in 2003, 2004, 2005. Individually, the team has had 15 runner-up finishes in events at nationals.
Tennis – Have won a GLVC-record nine conference championships. Qualified for the NCAA Division II National Championship seven times. ITA Academic All American team every year from 2003 to 2012.
Indoor Track – Andrea Horban won the 2006 NCAA II Indoor Shot Put Championship, while Emily Schaaf finished 2nd in the high jump on the same day. UIndy won the 2009 GLVC Indoor Track and Field Championship.
Outdoor Track and Field – Key Stadium – Team has won a league record eight GLVC Outdoor Track and Field Championships.
Volleyball – Ruth Lilly Center – 15-straight 22 win seasons from 1999 to 2014. 2003, 2009, 2011 and 2013 GLVC Champions. Has been to nine NCAA Tournaments (2003, 2007–14) with an Elite 8 appearances in 2009 & 2012 and Sweet 16 appearances in 2009, 2010, 2011, 2012 and 2013.

References

External links